The Pied Piper of Hamelin has appeared many times in popular culture.

Direct adaptations
Many of the direct adaptations of the story are based on the poem "The Pied Piper of Hamelin" by English poet Robert Browning, first published in the 1842 collection Dramatic Lyrics.

Film
 The Browning poem was adapted in 1933 as an animated Walt Disney Silly Symphony short.
 In 1945, an animated short adaptation, The Pied Piper of Basin Street, was produced by Walter Lantz Productions as part of the Swing Symphony series.
 The 1957 television film The Pied Piper of Hamelin (and the first-ever TV film) is a musical version in color, using the music of Edvard Grieg and starring Van Johnson in a dual role as both the title character and the local schoolmaster.
 The 1972 film The Pied Piper is an especially dark and realistic version of the tale, set in the 14th century during the time of the Black Plague. The film was directed by Jacques Demy and starred Donovan as the Piper.
 A stop-motion claymation half-hour version was made in 1981 in the United Kingdom by Cosgrove Hall, directed by Mark Hall and narrated by Robert Hardy, reciting the Browning poem verbatim. This version was later shown as an episode of the American PBS series Long Ago and Far Away.
 The Pied Piper is a 1986 Czechoslovak stop-motion animated feature film directed by Jiří Barta, notable for its unusual dark art direction, innovative animation techniques and lack of almost any understandable dialogue with all words spoken in gibberish.

Television 
 In 1985, Nicholas Meyer wrote and directed an adaptation of "The Pied Piper of Hamelin" for Shelley Duvall's  Faerie Tale Theatre, with original music by James Horner and starring Eric Idle as both the title character and "Robert Browning". All of Browning's poetry was faithfully preserved.

Literature 

 The Pied Piper story is heavily referenced by the Russian poet Marina Tsvetaeva in her poem "The Ratcatcher", first published in 1925.
 Russell Brand's first children's book, Russell Brand's Trickster Tales: the Pied Piper of Hamelin (2001), provided an unusual take on the traditional Pied Piper story.
 The novel Peter & Max, written by Bill Willingham, tells the story of the Pied Piper, among other fairy tales.  This book is a tie-in to his popular comic series Fables.

Radio and podcasts
 The Mickey Mouse Theater of the Air broadcast a version featuring Mickey and Minnie Mouse, Donald Duck, Goofy and Hans Conried as "The Pied Piper" on March 13, 1938.
 The poem was dramatized on the December 12, 1944 broadcast of Author's Playhouse.
 Donald Ogden Stewart narrated the story, with Arthur Q. Bryan as The Mayor, on the July 21, 1946 broadcast of Columbia Workshop.
 David Tennant narrated the Browning poem, with Bertie Gilbert as "The Boy", in a version broadcast on Boxing Day (December 26) 2011 on BBC Radio 4 and directed by Susan Roberts, with music and songs written and performed by John Harle, lyrics by Joyce Harle and sung by Thomas Platts, head chorister at Canterbury Cathedral with the choir of Wingham School Kent.
 In Episode 24 of the podcast Lore, Aaron Mahnke tells the story of the Pied Piper and the supposed history behind it.

Comics 
Grimm Fairy Tales #12 is entitled "The Pied Piper of Hamelin".

Music
  "The Pied Piper of Hamelin", by Robert Browning, set to music for Tenor and Bass Soli, Chorus, and Orchestra, by C. Hubert H. Parry, 1905.
 Ray Noble and his New Mayfair Orchestra recorded the song "Pied Piper of Hamelin (Gailero Pintoresco de Hamelin)" in 1931.
 The folk singer Malvina Reynolds wrote the song "The Pied Piper" and recorded it in 1960 for the LP Another County Heard From. The song tells the story of the Pied Piper of Hamelin in twelve verses.
 A musical version with book by Howard Williams, lyrics by Norman Newell and music by Roger Webb was recorded and released on LP in 1972 by Starline Records (SRS 5144) and on cassette in 1982 by the Pied Piper Cassette Club (Multi Media Tapes Ltd, PPCC 101). The cast included David Frost as The Storyteller and Jon Pertwee as the Pied Piper. The recording included six original songs: "Happy", "Nobody Loves a Rat", "The Song of the Pied Piper", "Money", "The Lesson of Life" and "Lullaby Land".
 "Der Rattenfänger" is a song by the German songwriter Hannes Wader, released on the 1974 album Der Rattenfänger, telling the story of the Pied Piper of Hamelin.
 John Corigliano composed the Pied Piper Fantasy (1979–82), a concerto for flute and orchestra. The work was premièred on February 4, 1982 at the Hollywood Bowl in Los Angeles by flute virtuoso James Galway and the Los Angeles Philharmonic. The world première recording was made on December 8 and December 9, 1985 and released on RCA Victor, performed by Galway and the Eastman Philharmonic, conducted by David Effron. Another version is available on Koch International Classics, performed by Alexa Still and the New Zealand Symphony Orchestra and conducted by James Sedares.
 Progressive rock band Mother Gong's 1979 album Fairy Tales includes the story of the Pied Piper of Hamelin.
 Italian singer and songwriter Edoardo Bennato recorded the album È arrivato un bastimento (1983) based on the Pied Piper fairy tale.
 "The Whistler" (1999) is a song by the German/American heavy metal band Demons and Wizards. The song suggests that the Pied Piper fed the children to the rats.
Composer Julie Giroux composed the multi-movement piece "Symphony of Fables" (2006), which includes a movement entitled "The Pied Piper of Hamelin".
In 2007, singer/songwriter Ken Lonnquist released the album HAMELIN (Songs of The Pied Piper) (MTM20/TRM 50)  retelling the story with some changes: this version concludes with the Mayor and Corporation being forced by the angry townspeople to confess that they cheated the Piper and driven out of town; The Piper reappears and agrees to return the children; and the lame boy is changed to a lame orphan girl whom The Piper chooses to become his companion. The album is currently available in digital format on Amazon Music Prime and Apple Music.

Opera
Der Rattenfänger von Hameln, a grand opera in five acts by Viktor Nessler to a German libretto by Friedrich Hofmann based on a poem by Julius Wolff (Leipzig, 19 March 1879).
 Another opera of the same name by German-American composer Adolf Neuendorff to a German libretto was produced in 1880 but has disappeared from the repertoire. However, a recording of one of the arias from this opera, "Wandern, ach, Wandern," by Fritz Wunderlich is to be found on the EMI album, Fritz Wunderlich – Der Grosse Deutsche Tenor, a three CD set.
 An opera entitled The Piper of Hamelin, written and composed by Nicolas Flagello in 1970. Unlike the original story, this opera has a happy ending: while the Piper leads the children from town, he later returns alone and is freely given the promised 1,000 guilders by the distraught and repentant townspeople, and the children are reunited with their parents.
 Friedrich Cerha's 1987 opera Der Rattenfänger is based on Carl Zuckmayer's 1975 play.
 Mark Alburger's opera, The Pied Piper of Hamelin (2004), with a libretto after the Browning poem, was premiered at Thick House Theater in San Francisco (2006), with the Piper in the guise of George W. Bush and the Rats as terrorists.
 George Benjamin's opera, Into The Little Hill, with libretto by Martin Crimp, was commissioned by the Festival d'Automne à Paris, and first performed at the Festival d'Automne, Paris on 22 November 2006.
 Matthew King's opera, The Pied Piper, with libretto by Michael Irwin, was commissioned by Stour Music Festival, and first performed in 22 June 2015 with Michael Chance in the title role.

Recordings
 The complete soundtrack of the 1933 Walt Disney Silly Symphony animated short, taken from the actual sound film by permission of Walt Disney Enterprises, was released on 78rpm by Bluebird Records (BK-7). 
 Decca Records issued a 78rpm recording of the Browning poem read by Ingrid Bergman with music composed and directed by Victor Young.
 Alec Templeton narrated Browning's poem in a 78rpm recording released in the 1950s on RCA Victor (Y-360).
 Dick narrated Robert Browning's poem in a 78rpm recording released in the 1950s on Columbia Records, later re-released in LP format on Harmony Records.
 Boris Karloff performed a reading of The Pied Piper & The Hunting of the Snark, released on Caedmon Records.
 Laurence Olivier read a version of the story on a Lantern Records 45rpm release (LYN 962), later released on LP as part of Golden Hour of Best Loved Fairy Stories (Golden Hour, GH-516) released in 1966.
 Gene Kelly read Robert Browning's poem on a Columbia Records 2-record 78rpm set (MJ 34 01) in 1947, later re-released on Harmony Records in LP format in the 1960s.
 In the 1960s, a dramatization of the story was released as part of the Tale Spinners for Children LP series (UAC 11017), performed by the Famous Theatre Company.
 In 1968, Peter Ustinov recorded the Browning poem as part of Peter Ustinov Reads Cautionary Verse, released on LP by Argo Records in 1986 (RG 599, SW 506, ARG 3067) and on cassette as The Cautionary Tales in 1968 by the Musical Heritage Society (MHC 9249M).
 Orson Welles narrated the poem in a 1981 recording used as the audio portion of First Choice: Authors and Books, a presentation used in classrooms (possibly on microfilm, as one version of the recording contains audio signals).
 Keith Baxter is the narrator of The Pied Piper and Other Stories, recorded and released in 1994 by HarperCollins Publishing.
 Anton Lesser reads Browning's poem in the 2016 Naxos Audiobooks recording of The Pied Piper of Hamelin and Other Favorite Poems.

Theatre 
 A musical entitled The Pied Piper of Hamelin, written and composed by Harvey Shield and Richard Jarboe, was produced and performed at the Olio Theater in Los Angeles in 1984; the original title was 1284, the year in which the actual Pied Piper visited Hamelin. A recording of the soundtrack was released in 1984 on Panda Digital with Harvey Shield, John Hostetter, Jodi Mitchel, J.D. Ellis, Joey Sheck, Susan Holmes, Del Appleby and Lesley Sachs.
 A children's musical called Rats! The Musical with music by Nigel Hess and lyrics by Jeremy Browne was created in 1987. The musical has speaking rat punks and is intended to be performed in schools.

Loose adaptations

Film
 In the 1920 Jerry on the Job short Cheating the Piper, Jerry uses a saxophone to lure the rats away from the train station.
 Warner Bros. cartoons occasionally referenced the story.  Pied Piper Porky casts Porky Pig in the role, as does Paying the Piper. Book Revue shows the cover of a book jokingly titled The Pie-Eyed Piper, whose title character plays his instrument as part of the musical show that dominates the cartoon. The Pied Piper of Guadalupe starred Sylvester as the piper trying to trap mice; he is eventually defeated by Speedy Gonzales.
 The Pink Panther played the title character in the animated short Pink Piper (1976), in which The Pink Piper tries to rid The Little Man's house of a mouse.
 A direct-to-video cartoon, It's the Pied Piper, Charlie Brown, was released in 2000.  In the special, Charlie Brown reads to Sally Brown a less-scary version of the Pied Piper story with dancing/sports mice instead of rampaging rats and the cheating mayor and town officials being bewitched out of town instead of the children. Snoopy portrays the title character, but plays a concertina instead of a flute.
 The 2003 Nickelodeon television film The Electric Piper is an animated musical adaptation of the story, set in a 1960s American town, with a rock-and-roll guitarist (voiced by Wayne Brady) as the title character.

Television
 The episode "Scatty Safari" of the British comedy The Goodies parodied the Pied Piper story, substituting Rolf Harris for the rats.
 A 1971 episode of Sesame Street featured a "Sesame Street News Flash" sketch in which roving reporter Kermit the Frog is in Hamelin interviewing a very "hip" Pied Piper.
 A 1980 episode of The Muppet Show featured a brief, altered re-telling of "The Pied Piper of Hamelin" featuring a town of rats overrun by a horde of ravenous children. The role of the Pied Piper was played by that episode's special guest, French flautist Jean-Pierre Rampal playing "Ease on Down the Road".
 In the 2013 anime Problem Children Are Coming from Another World, Aren't They?, the Pied Piper is one of the antagonists in an arc which heavily involved the incident and what really happened to the children.

Literature
In 1954, Walt Kelly's Pogo annual, The Pogo Stepmother Goose, included an illustrated story called "The Town on the Edge of the End".  Here the townspeople are plagued by various monsters, not rats, and the Piper's only demand is that "after the town has become bonny and gay, then you'll keep it that way."  After the piper leaves, the townspeople are so concerned with preventing the return of the monsters that they become suspicious of each other and cruel to their children.  Eventually the Piper returns and pipes the children away to a better life, leaving the townspeople grateful to be rid of them, and content to sink into their gloom.
 In his poem, "The One Who Stayed" (in the collection Where the Sidewalk Ends, 1974) Shel Silverstein tells the story of a child who stayed behind while the rest of Hamelin's children followed the Piper's song.
 Harlan Ellison's "Emissary from Hamelin" (included in his collection Strange Wine, 1978) tells of a descendant of the original Pied Piper coming back 700 years later to lead all the adults away as punishment for centuries of "making the world a bad place".
 The Ratastrophe Catastrophe (1990) by David Lee Stone is a parody based on the Pied Piper about a boy called Diek who takes away the children of a town because a voice in his head told him to.
 What Happened in Hamelin (1993), by Gloria Skurzynski, is a young adult novel in which ergotism from contaminated rye crops helps explain the mystery of what happened there.
 The Maestro by Judd Palmer is a children's book and the second volume of Palmer's Preposterous Fables for Unusual Children.  The protagonist is Hannah, a girl who has moved to a town where music is banned after a Maestro stole all the children with music. When she is caught singing, she is exiled to a mountain cave where she finds the evil Maestro with his orchestra. After she frees the children and saves the Maestro from the angry townspeople, she alone stays with the Maestro out of free will because she wants to be his student.
 The story provides the basis for the central plot and several characters in the 1998 debut novel King Rat, by China Miéville.
 Terry Pratchett's The Amazing Maurice and His Educated Rodents (2001) is a humorous take on the Pied Piper.
 The 2005 novel The Rats of Hamelin by Adam McCune and Keith McCune is about an eighteen-year-old Pied Piper who faces a hidden enemy with powers like his own.
 Jane Yolen and Adam Stemple's 2005 novel Pay the Piper: A Rock 'n' Roll Fairy Tale reworks the story in an urban fantasy setting.
 Piper, a 2017 liberal adaptation of the original story into a young adult graphic novel written by Jay Asher and Jessica Freeburg and illustrated by Jeff Stokely.
 The Pied Piper is a central figure in Rainbow Valley and Rilla of Ingleside by Lucy Maud Montgomery, calling, or in hindsight luring, that generation of boys off to war.

Radio and podcasts
 On 23 August 2000, BBC Radio 4 broadcast The Amazing Ratman Story, a radio play by Dave Sheasby and directed by Pam Fraser Solomon in which a TV crew interviews an old man in a nursing home who claims to have personally witnessed the events concerning The Pied Piper. The play featured Bernard Cribbins, Geraldine Fitzgerald and Colin Salmon.
 As part of BBC Radio 4's Fright Night Shorts on 26 October 2016, Peter Marinker performed a reading of John Connolly's story "The Rat King", a macabre re-telling of the Pied Piper story.
 The Piper, a modern-day retelling of the story written by Vickie Donoghue and Natalie Mitchell, was broadcast by BBC Radio in November 2020 as a 9-episode podcast, directed by Kate Rowland and with a soundtrack by Natasha Khan. It starred Tamzin Outhwaite, Charlee Lou Borthwick, Rosalina McDonagh, Coco Awork, Kacey Ainsworth and Kassius Carey Johnson.

Other references to the Pied Piper legend

Film
 In the unreleased 1972 film The Day the Clown Cried, Helmut Doork (Jerry Lewis) ends up accidentally accompanying the children on a boxcar train to Auschwitz, and he is eventually used, in Pied Piper fashion, to help lead the Jewish children to their deaths in the gas chamber.
 The 1989 film Food of the Gods II is about rats who grow to giant size. The sports complex, including a swimming pool, in the film, is named Hamlin (sic).
 Sailor Moon Super S: The Movie (1995) draws strong inspirations from the Pied Piper.
 The 1997 movie The Sweet Hereafter, about a town that suffers a horrifying school bus accident wherein nearly all their children are killed, heavily references the Pied Piper and quotes liberally from the Browning version.
 In the 2001 film Shrek, the Pied Piper is seen at the main character's swamp, where every fairy tale creature has gathered to escape Lord Farquaad. The 2010 sequel Shrek Forever After also features Pied Piper as a minor character; he is hired by the main villain, Rumpelstiltskin, to use his music to lead the rebelling Ogres to their imprisonment (while making them dance to "Shake Your Groove Thing").
 In A Nightmare on Elm Street (2010), the characters' research of Freddy Krueger provides them with the legend of the Piper.

Television
 A 1968 episode of Batman, "Nora Clavicle and her Ladies' Crime Club", contains a scene wherein Batman rids Gotham City of a mechanical rat infestation by playing tunes on a flute and leading the rodents to a watery grave in the city harbor.
 A 1970 episode of Land of the Giants titled "Pay the Piper" has as its villain a character (played by Jonathan Harris) implied to be the same Pied Piper who stole Hamelin's children centuries earlier. This character tells the Little People that he is neither human nor giant.
 During the motorsport career of Dale Earnhardt Jr., when the NASCAR series would be on a restrictor plate circuit, commentator Mike Joy of Fox Sports would refer to Earnhardt as the "pied piper," because of the follow-the-leader style and how drivers would follow him to the front of the field.
In the 2010 Season 2 19th episode of Fox drama series Lie to Me, the "Pied Piper" is a child killer.
In an episode of Lost Girl, the main villain of the episode reveals that some people call him Slender Man but most know him as the "Pied Piper" and makes a reference to luring away human children.
In the Once Upon a Time episode "Nasty Habits," the Pied Piper is revealed to be another name for the current main antagonist, Peter Pan. The children Pan lured away later became the first Lost Boys.
2015 Korean drama The Pied Piper features the eponymous antagonist, a terrorist who incites outcasts of the society to commit terrorist attacks.
A 1999/2000 (depending on location) episode of the Pokémon anime, known as "Pikachu Re-Volts" in English-speaking territories, is largely based on The Pied Piper of Hamelin, featuring a group using Drowzee- a psychic Pokémon- to abduct other Pokémon by hypnotising them.
 In "The Day of the Clown", a 2008 episode of the British science fiction show The Sarah Jane Adventures, the Pied Piper is said to have been an alien who fed on fear.
 In the 2014 comedy series Silicon Valley, Pied Piper is the name of the fictional company founded by the lead character.
 The 2019 American mystery teen drama series The Society has elements of the Pied Piper tale. It begins with a man named Pfeiffer (the german term for piper) being hired by the small town of West Ham to get rid of a strange smell. When the town refuses to pay him, it is implied that he is responsible for sending the children to a version of the town that is cut off from the rest of the world.
In the Star Trek: Deep Space Nine episode "Playing God", Chief O'Brien has to deal with an infestation of Cardassian voles on the station that are chewing the wires, causing localized power failures. Dr Bashir, as a joke, gives O'Brien a flute with a note saying "It worked in Hamlin".
 A 1976 Wonder Woman episode titled "Pied Piper" features rock artist "Hamlin Rule" who uses his flute and other sound effects to control girls' minds.
 A 1978 episode of Super Friends, called "The Pied Piper from Space", featured an alien spacecraft that broadcast a strange signal that turned children into zombies.
A 2000 Japanese animated series called Boogiepop Phantom featured a character called Poom Poom, a phantom created by a phenomenon, who is modeled from the memory of a child starring in the role of the Pied Piper on a stage production.
 A 2003 episode of Law & Order: Special Victims Unit features a cult leader luring teenage girls to his hideout using psychological manipulation and arranging flights with fake passports, akin to the Pied Piper.
 In the Japanese series Eureka Seven: AO, aired in 2012, Pied Piper names one of the teams used by Generation Bleu to investigate and study the Scub Coral and Secrets.
 In a 2011 episode of Grimm entitled "Danse Macabre",  the Pied Piper figure is re-imagined as a popular underground DJ named "Retchid Kat", who is also a teenage music prodigy.
 Season 3 of AMC's The Killing involves a serial killer called "the Pied Piper" who targets homeless teenage girls and runaways.
 Season 3 of The Tunnel involves a serial killer who mimics the Pied Piper in his crimes.
 A 2019 episode of Criminal Minds called "Hamelin" involves several children vanishing from their homes in the same night.

Literature
 In 1556, De miraculis sui temporis (Latin: Concerning the Wonders of his Times) by Jobus Fincelius mentions the tale. The author identifies the Piper with the devil.
 The motif of The Pied Piper as a rat catcher is present in The Wonderful Adventures of Nils (1907) by Selma Lagerlöf.
 In Robert McCloskey's 1943 novel Homer Price the fifth chapter "Nothing New Under the Sun (Hardly)" has a Pied Piper like character.
In Eric Nylund's Mortal Coils, Louis Piper, who is Lucifer, is also an incarnation of the Pied Piper.
 In Garth Nix's The Keys to the Kingdom series, a character called the Piper appears as an antagonist. Along with being able to use the music of his pipe to cast sorcery, he led both the Raised Rats and the Piper's Children into the House, a clear reference to the traditional story.
 In the 2006 novel Into the Woods by Lyn Gardner, the three female protagonists' ancestor is hinted at being the Pied Piper.
 In Beyond the Spiderwick Chronicles: A Giant Problem (2008), the Pied Piper story inspires Nick Vargas to use mermaids to lure the giants away with their song.
In Darren Shan's novel Hunters of the Dusk, Darren describes Desmond Tiny as beaming like a rat catcher in league with the Pied Piper of Hamelin, and that his reappearance meant nothing but trouble would happen.
 Dan Rhodes' 2010 novel Little Hands Clapping takes its title from a line from Robert Browning's poem "The Pied Piper of Hamelin".
In Scott Westerfeld's young adult novel Afterworlds, Lizzie's main antagonist in the afterworld, who preys on ghost children, is called Mr. Hamlyn.

Comics 
 Captain Marvel Jr. #2 (December 1942) "The Pied Piper of Himmler" in which a Nazi Fifth column leads a group of mostly-teenage boys to a secret facility to radicalize them; the lame child shut out is none other than Freddy Freeman himself who transforms into his superhero form to rescue the others.
 The Pied Piper (created in 1959) is a reformed villain from the Flash's Rogues Gallery.
 Carl Barks made reference to the story in an issue of Uncle Scrooge Adventures when Scrooge, concerned about rats gnawing at his cash, hires Gyro Gearloose to rid Duckburg of all rats. Rather than music, Gyro invents a powerful cheese which attracts all rodents, and when astonished citizens watch him leading a huge procession of rats through the streets, comments "I am the Pied Piper of Duckburg!". The problem does not recur, however, because Scrooge honestly pays Gyro for the work that he was hired for.
 Writer Lars Jensen and artist Flemming Andersen created "The Ghost Rats of Hamelin" (2001), a Donald Duck comics adventure published in English in Donald Duck Adventures Take-Along Comic #6 (2004). In it, Hamelin is plagued once a year for a term of one week by the giant-size ghosts of the Pied Piper's rat victims. Donald and Fethry Duck, members of the Tamers of Nonhuman Threats, are sent to destroy these ghosts. Also true to the story was that the mayor is shown as a cowardly politician who uses political talk to stiff Fethry and Donald out of their fees.
 The Pied Piper makes an appearance in Alan Moore's Promethea where he is unleashed on the children of a sect dedicated to hunting the heroine down after being warned to end their efforts.
 The Pied Piper's pipe has an important role in Dylan Dog #210, "Il Pifferaio Magico" (trans. "The Magic Piper").

Music
(alphabetized by composer or artist)
  Swedish band ABBA's song "The Piper", from the 1980 album Super Trouper, compares a rock star with the legendary Pied Piper.
 "Pied Piper" is a song composed by Ian Anderson, released on Jethro Tull's concept album Too Old to Rock 'n' Roll: Too Young to Die! (1976)
 "Play Minstrel, Play" by Blackmore's Night seems to reference the legend.  The lyrics mention neither children nor rats, but a musician who comes to lead an evil from a town, which the town comes to regret.
  "Pied Piper" is the fifth track on K-POP group BTS' album, "Her" (2017). The song refers to the band themselves as the Pied Piper, leading their fans away from real life responsibilities.
 "The Pied Piper" is a 1965 song by American duo The Changin' Times, in which the singer compares himself to the Pied Piper. Crispian St. Peters had a hit recording of it in 1966.
 Folk singer Donovan, who starred in the 1972 film The Pied Piper as the title character, recorded the song "People Call Me the Pied Piper", which was included in his album Pied Piper, released on the Music for Little People label.
 The song "Good Rats" by Celtic punk band Dropkick Murphys contains the line "Like mice behind a piper, rats from all around came to this factory in old Dublin-town", referring to the early popularity of the Guinness Brewery and its legend that rats and mice are part of its brewing recipe.
The song "Lose Yourself" by Eminem contains the line "Best believe somebody's paying the pied piper".
 Progressive rock band Genesis mentions the Piper in "Apocalypse in 9/8", Part 6 of the song "Supper's Ready" from their album Foxtrot in the verse: "With the guards of Magog, swarming around, The Pied Piper takes his children underground"
 Led Zeppelin's classic "Stairway To Heaven", recorded in 1970 for the Led Zeppelin IV album,  mentions the Piper in two verses: "If we all call the tune, then the piper will lead us to reason", and "Your head is humming and it won't go in case you don't know the piper's calling you to join him", although, due to the mention of woods and forest, this piper may be a reference to Pan.
 "Pied Piper" is a song on the album The Mother and the Enemy from 2001 by Polish metal band Lux Occulta.
 Thrash metal band Megadeth mentions the Pied Piper in the chorus of the song "Symphony of Destruction" with "Just like the Pied Piper led rats through the streets, we dance like marionettes, swaying to the symphony... of Destruction " , from the album Countdown to Extinction
 The song "Blessed Are the Sick" by death metal band Morbid Angel contains a flute solo as an outro entitled "Leading the Rats".
 Alternative rock band A Perfect Circle's 2013 single "By and Down" makes reference to the Pied Piper throughout the song, containing the lines "Rode the Piper by and down the river" and "Pied Piper, float on down the river".
 Pied Piper is a 2008 album and song by the Japanese rock band the pillows.
  Rock band Queen quoted lines "and their dogs outran our fallow deer, and honey-bees had lost their stings, and horses were born with eagles' wings" in the song "My Fairy King" (1973) directly from the book The Pied Piper Of Hamlin.
 The Pied Piper story is also referenced by alternative rock band Radiohead in their song "Kid A" during the final lines: "rats and children will follow me out of town"
 "Pied Piper" is a song on the 1992 album All The Way From Tuam by Irish group The Saw Doctors; it reached number 3 in the Irish Music Charts.

Theatre
 In the 2003 play The Pillowman by Martin McDonagh, the main character had written a story explaining the origin of the lame child who could not follow the Piper.
 In 2002, the ballet The Contract composed by Michael Torke, libretto by Robert Sirman and choreographed by James Kudelka was created to celebrate the National Ballet of Canada's 50th Anniversary season. Taking as its inspiration the story of the Pied Piper, The Contract focuses on the character of "Eva", a charismatic faith healer who is contracted to rid a small community of a mysterious illness that afflicts the town's young people. She succeeds, but when the town's elders find reason to disapprove of her private conduct, they refuse to honor the contract, precipitating an even greater tragedy. In May 2003, the National Ballet of Canada Orchestra recorded a CD of Michael Torke's original music for The Contract.
 The 2008 Plague! The Musical featured the Pied Piper of Hamelin as a big-headed celebrity heartthrob, rat catcher and rival in love to the hero during the 1665 Great Plague of London. Specific mention is made of the kidnapping of the children of Hamelin. After singing the heroic song, Pay the Piper, and leaving to battle the rats who have started the plague, the Pied Piper is dismissively killed by the Rat King using rigged explosives in the sewers of London.

Gaming
 In the game Black & White, an optional sidequest on the first island involves a piper who is leading the children of your village away to a cave in the mountains.
 The MMO game Dungeon Fighter Online (known as Dungeon and Fighter in Asian countries), contains a game stage called Hamelin; the boss of the stage - called The Piper - summons rats and plays his pipe to attack players.
 In the guitar learning game WildChords, a breakout in the local zoo of Ovelin has occurred. The protagonist Giuseppe has to hypnotize the animals with guitar music and lure them out of the city. The user can hypnotize the animals by playing the correct chords on a real guitar: C to crocodile, Am to the sad ape, etc. In the intro story, a tale of "The gaudily garbed guitarist of Ovelin" is introduced.
 In Chronicle Mode of Samurai Warriors 4, Kojuro Katakura referenced the story of the Pied Piper when you raise his friendship level for the third time.
 In The Elder Scrolls V: Skyrim a mad magician called 'Hamelyn' is attempting to build an army of skeevers (rat-like monsters) to attack the people who mocked and imprisoned him.
 In The Witcher 3: Wild Hunt, the Pied Piper can be seen playing a tune while in The Land of a Thousand Fables.
 In the Tabletop Skirmish game Malifaux, the master Hamelin, based on the Pied Piper tale, is often luring children to their demise, and controlling hordes of rats.
 In Time Crisis 4 The Hamlin Battalion uses sounds to control weaponized insects against the enemy and was involved in biological weapons research on animals as well.
In OZMAFIA!!, as the romanceable character Hamelin : The one-eyed piper, Former don of the Grimm family. He appears as a cruel and unstable antagonist, and has blonde hair and gray eyes, one of which is hidden by a mysterious eyepatch.
 In the mobile card game Plants vs. Zombies Heroes, the card Pied Piper uses a magic pipe to debuff an opposing card.
 In the mobile card game Shōjo Kageki Revue Starlight: Re LIVE, the Pied Piper of Hamelin is interpreted by the character Michiru Ōtori as a theatrical role.
 In Left 4 Dead 2, there is an achievement called "Fried Piper". It can be obtained by killing a clown zombie that's being followed by 10 other zombies using a Molotov during the Dark Carnival campaign.

Other
R. Kelly claims to be "The Pied Piper of R&B"
 The cover of Yazoo's single "Don't Go" had this motif.

References

Topics in popular culture
Pied Piper of Hamelin